Wellston is an unincorporated community and census-designated place in Norman Township, Manistee County, Michigan, United States. Its population was 246 as of the 2020 census. The community is in the Manistee National Forest just south of M-55, about 20 miles east of Manistee and about 25 miles west of Cadillac. Wellston has a post office with ZIP code 49689.

Geography

M-55 is a highway just north of the community.

Demographics

History
Wellston was named for its first postmaster, Adelmer J. Wells. The post office officially opened June 30, 1892. The town was founded by the Swigart Land Company along the Chicago and West Michigan Railroad. Wellston is home to the critically ill children's ministry Little Mary's Hospitality House, which was founded in 1982.

References

Unincorporated communities in Manistee County, Michigan
Unincorporated communities in Michigan
Census-designated places in Manistee County, Michigan
Census-designated places in Michigan